Rishte Naate is a 1965 Indian Hindi-language drama film directed by K. S. Gopalakrishnan. The film stars Raaj Kumar, Jamuna, Nutan and Nazir Hussain. It is a remake of Gopalakrishnan's own Tamil film Karpagam (1963).

Plot 
Thakur Narendrapal Singh (Nazir Hussain) is a generous and kind-hearted landlord and zamindar. He has a daughter Kalpana (Jamuna) and a son Raja (Deven Verma). Distrusting his son and his new wife, Roopa (Ameeta), he asks a village laborer, Sunder (Raaj Kumar) who is honest, loyal and hardworking, to marry his daughter. In this manner, Sunder and Kalpana marry, and soon Roopa gives birth to a daughter Meenakshi (Baby Shakila). Roopa was not taking good care of her own daughter. Sunder and Kalpana raise Meenakshi as their own daughter and give her a lot of love. Meenakshi was so attached with Sunder and Kalpana, that she thinks they are her real parents and refuses to call her own parents Mother and Father. Tragically, Kalpana is killed by a wild ox saving the child Meenakshi. The Thakur, Sunder, and the child are devastated. The Thakur asks Sunder to marry Savitri (Nutan), who is the daughter of his childhood friend, the local Collector (David). He hopes that in this manner the child will get the love of a mother. Sunder reluctantly agrees, so that child gets the love of a mother and soon Savitri and he marry. Savitri is unable to win the love of the child, nor does she get any affection from Sunder, as he is unable to get Kalpana out of his mind and thoughts. In the meantime, Roopa's father  Tandav prasad (Kanaiyalal) is plotting the death of Sunder, so that his daughter can take over the wealth of the Thakur after his death. In a fight clash, Savitri gets seriously injured and lands in hospital hanging between life and death. But Meenakshi saves her by calling her mother for the first time and finally Sunder accepts her. Tandav is arrested by the police for his misdeeds.

Cast 
 Raaj Kumar – Sundar
 Jamuna – Kalpana
 Nutan – Savitri
 Deven Verma – Raja
 Ameeta – Roopa
 Nazir Hussain – Thakur Narendrapal Singh
 David – Collector Ramnarayan
 Kanhaiyalal – Tandav Prasad
 Dhumal – Diwanji
 Baby Shakila – Meenakshi
 Chandrima Bhaduri – Mausi
 V. D. Puranik – Thakur's Friend

Soundtrack 
The soundtrack was composed by Madan Mohan. The song "Ari Neendiya Ki Pari" is based on the song "Athaimadi Methayadi" from the movie Karpagam.

References

External links 
 

1965 films
1960s Hindi-language films
Films scored by Madan Mohan
Hindi remakes of Tamil films